Triphysaria is a genus of five plants in the family Orobanchaceae which are known generally as owl's-clovers. This genus is closely related to the genera Castilleja and Orthocarpus.  Triphysaria are native to western North America, including a species endemic to California.

Description
These plants, like those in many other genera in the family, are facultative hemiparasites on other plants. They produce haustoria that tap into the roots of other plants to extract some of the nutrients they need.

The plants bear spike inflorescences of pouched, folded flowers that have lips shaped like the beak of an owl.

The plant contains its own chlorophyll and are able to undergo photosynthesis, although limited. Without hosts, the species are not able to flourish as greatly.

Species
Triphysaria eriantha - johnny-tuck, butter-and-eggs
Triphysaria floribunda - San Francisco owl's-clover  [California endemic]
Triphysaria micrantha - purplebeak owl's-clover
Triphysaria pusilla - dwarf owl's-clover
Triphysaria versicolor - yellowbeak owl's-clover

References

External links
Jepson Manual Treatment: Triphysaria
zipcodezoo: Triphysaria

Further reading
Yoder, J. I. and D. S. Jamison. (2001). Heritable variation in quinone-induced haustorium development in the parasitic plant Triphysaria. Plant Physiology 125 1870
Torres M. J., Tomilov A. A., Tomilova N., Reagan R. L., Yoder J. I. 2005. Pscroph, a parasitic plant EST database enriched for parasite associated transcripts BMC Plant Biology 5:24 (16 November 2005)

Orobanchaceae genera
Orobanchaceae
Flora of the Western United States
Flora of California